Prince Charles Island is a large, low-lying island in Canada. It is located in Foxe Basin, off the west coast of Baffin Island, in the Qikiqtaaluk Region of Nunavut, Canada. Though Prince Charles Island has no permanent residents, Inuit visited the island to hunt caribou; the island has no specific name in the Inuktitut language. Despite the island's size, it was not recorded by Western cartographers until 1932, when the tug captain W. A. Poole first sighted it. His information never made it onto any published map. Although, it was rediscovered in 1948 by Albert-Ernest Tomkinson navigating an Avro Lancaster for the RCAF 408 (Photo) Squadron. The island was named for British Prince Charles (later King Charles III), who was born in November the same year.

References

 Sea islands: Atlas of Canada; Natural Resources Canada

Further reading

 Morrison, R. I. G. 1997. "The Use of Remote Sensing to Evaluate Shorebird Habitats and Populations on Prince Charles Island, Foxe Basin, Canada". Arctic. 50, no. 1: 55.

Islands of Foxe Basin
Uninhabited islands of Qikiqtaaluk Region
Charles III